Episcia is a genus of flowering plants in the African violet family, Gesneriaceae. The ten species it contains are native to the tropical regions of Central and South America. The species are perennial herbaceous plants characterized by a stoloniferous habit, red (rarely orange, pink, blue or yellow) flowers, and frequently have marked or patterned leaves. Episcias are sometimes called flame violets.

Taxonomy 

The genus name is derived from the Greek επισκισς (episkios), meaning "shaded". This refers to the understory habitat of these plants.

For much of the twentieth century Episcia had a broad circumscription but since 1978 has been restricted to a much narrower one, with the genera Paradrymonia, Chrysothemis, Nautilocalyx, and Alsobia separated from it. The segregation of these genera from Episcia has been supported in recent molecular phylogenies.

Species 

Section Episcia
 Episcia andina Wiehler
 Episcia cupreata (Hook.) Hanst.
 Episcia duidae Feuillet
 Episcia lilacina Hanst.
 Episcia prancei  Wiehler
 Episcia reptans Mart.
 Episcia xantha Leeuwenb.
Section Trematanthera (Leeuwenb.) Feuillet
 Episcia fimbriata Fritsch
 Episcia sphalera Leeuwenb.
 Episcia rubra Feuillet

Cultivation 
They are frequently cultivated elsewhere and sometimes naturalize in tropical regions.  They are grown in the tropics, and in temperate regions as houseplants, primarily for their attractive foliage. Numerous cultivars have been produced, primarily by selection and hybridization of the species E. cupreata and E. reptans.

References 

 Feuillet, C. 2008. Folia taxonomica 7. Two new species and a new section in Episcia (Gesneriaceae) from the Venezuelan Guayana. J. Bot. Res. Int. Texas 2(1): 275-280.
 Wiehler, H. 1978. The genera Episcia, Alsobia, Nautilocalyx, and Paradrymonia (Gesneriaceae). Selbyana 5: 11-60.

External links 

 Episcia from The Genera of Gesneriaceae (Follow links)
 Episcia and Alsobia from the Gesneriad Reference Web

 
Gesneriaceae genera